This is the schedule for the 2012 LPGA of Korea Tour.

2012 schedule

Events in bold are majors.

LPGA KEB-HanaBank Championship is co-sanctioned with LPGA Tour.
Hyundai China Ladies Open is co-sanctioned with China LPGA Tour.

See also
2012 in golf

References

External links

LPGA of Korea Tour
LPGA of Korea Tour